These are the official results of the Women's 10,000 metres event at the 1986 European Championships in Stuttgart, West Germany. The event was held at Neckarstadion on 30 August 1986.

Medalists

Final

Participation
According to an unofficial count, 28 athletes from 16 countries participated in the event.

 (3)
 (1)
 (2)
 (2)
 (1)
 (2)
 (1)
 (1)
 (2)
 (2)
 (3)
 (1)
 (3)
 (1)
 (2)
 (1)

See also
 1987 Women's World Championships 10,000 metres (Rome)
 1988 Women's Olympic 10,000 metres (Seoul)
 1990 Women's European Championships 10,000 metres (Split)

References

 Results

10000
10,000 metres at the European Athletics Championships
Marathons in Germany
1986 in women's athletics